India is a country in the north of Indian Ocean that is the most vulnerable to getting hit by tropical cyclones in the basin, from the east or from the west.

Background

India is a country in South Asia that is bounded by the Arabian Sea, the Indian Ocean and the Bay of Bengal, while it shares land borders with Bangladesh, Bhutan, China, Myanmar, Nepal and Pakistan. India is also located within the vicinity of Sri Lanka and the Maldives, while its Andaman and Nicobar Islands share a maritime border with Thailand, Myanmar and Indonesia. On average around 2 to 4 tropical cyclones impact India every year, while most of these tropical cyclones impact the east coast of Indian states of West Bengal, Odisha, Andhra Pradesh, Tamil Nadu. The West Coast of India is less prone to cyclones with one cyclone out of 2 to 4 hits the west coast with majority of them attacking the state of Gujarat, Maharashtra, Goa, Karnataka and Kerala.

The Four Stage Warning
The IMD issues warnings in four stages for the Indian coast.

List of tropical cyclones by year

Note that records before 1960 are largely unreliable and storms that stayed at sea were often only reported by ship reports.

1860s

A powerful cyclone hit Calcutta, India on 5 October 1864, killing an estimated amount of 60,000 people.

November 1867 Great Calcutta cyclone
The anemometer in the city was blown away during the cyclone.  A lack of storm surge minimized the overall damage from this system.

1880s

June 1885 Aden cyclone
The ship Peshawar reported a westerly hurricane at the east end of the Gulf of Aden towards midnight on the night of June 2. At noon on June 3, the Tantallon reported a pressure of  near 12.5N 45.5E. On June 3, the German corvette Augusta, the French dispatch boat Renard, and the British ship SS Speke Hall were lost in the storm in the Gulf of Aden. The system continued westward and shrank in scale as it moved into the entrance of the Red Sea, crossing the coast of Djibouti. It became the first North Indian Ocean tropical cyclone in recorded history to transit the gulf of Aden with fully hurricane intensity and held the record of westernmost landfalling North Indian Ocean tropical cyclone ever and also the only recorded tropical cyclone to make landfall in the nation of Djibouti.

1885 Odisha cyclone
An intense cyclone struck Odisha.
It killed one person.

1888 Gujarat Cyclone
In November a violent cyclonic storm with hurricane-force winds strikes Gujarat causing a ship to sink. Around 1,300 people are killed during the storm.

1891
Siam Cyclone has formed in Philippine Sea as depression and made landfall on Philippines. And continue to its path, developed to Tropical Storm before entered Gulf Of Thailand. As it entered, it became typhoon and strengthening into Category-5 Status Tropical Cyclone. It made landfall on Thailand and then toward to Port Blair as Category-5 Tropical Cyclone. Siam Cyclone had weakening into Category-3 Status before made landfall at Northern India.

1900s

1902
In May 1902, a cyclonic storm struck the coast in the vicinity of Karachi.

1907

In June 1907, a tropical storm struck the coast near Karachi.

1910s

1910s

April 13–16, 1910 – A intense tropical existed over Andaman Sea.

1920s

1928

December 31, 1927 – January 5, 1928 – A depression existed over the southern Bay of Bengal.
February 29 – March 6, 1928 – A depression existed over the northeaster Arabian Sea.
March 24–28, 1928 – A cyclonic storm existed over the southern Bay of Bengal.

1929
There are 15 depressions and 6 cyclonic storms.

1930s

1930
May 2–7, 1930 – A cyclonic storm existed over the southern Bay of Bengal.
May 10–13, 1930 – A cyclonic storm existed over the northern Bay of Bengal.
June 14–16, 1930 – A shallow depression existed over the northeastern Bay of Bengal.
June 20–23, 1930 – A depression existed over the southeastern Arabian Sea.
June 27–30, 1930 – A cyclonic storm existed over the eastern Arabian Sea.
June 28 – July 1, 1930 – A cyclonic storm existed over the eastern Bay of Bengal.
July 8–10, 1930 – A shallow depression existed over the northern Bay of Bengal.
July 11–13, 1930 – A cyclonic storm existed over the northern Bay of Bengal.
July 21–24, 1930 – A depression existed over the northern Bay of Bengal.
September 6–8, 1930 – A depression existed over the Andaman Sea.

1940s

1940s
May 17–25, 1940 – A severe cyclonic storm existed over the Bay of Bengal.
June 23–27, 1940 – A cyclonic storm existed over the Bay of Bengal.
June 29 – July 5, 1940 – A severe cyclonic storm existed over the Bay of Bengal.
July 6–11, 1940 – A severe cyclonic storm existed over the Bay of Bengal.
August 1–11, 1940 – A cyclonic storm existed over the Bay of Bengal.
August 11–16, 1940 – A depression existed over the Bay of Bengal.
August 18–26, 1940 – A depression existed over the Bay of Bengal.
August 26 – September 1, 1940 – A depression existed over the Bay of Bengal.
September 14–24, 1940 – A depression existed over the Bay of Bengal.
September 17–21, 1940 – A depression existed over the Bay of Bengal.
October 9–20, 1940 – A severe cyclonic storm existed over the Arabian Sea.
October 19–22, 1940 – A severe cyclonic storm existed over the Bay of Bengal.
November 3–13, 1940 – A severe cyclonic storm existed over the Arabian Sea.
November 11–18, 1940 – A depression existed over the Bay of Bengal and the Arabian Sea.
November 14–24, 1940 – A cyclonic storm existed over the Bay of Bengal.
December 19–30, 1940 – A depression existed over the Bay of Bengal.

November 1940 Mumbai Cyclone 
In November 1940, a severe cyclone struck Mumbai, with gusts reaching reached 121 km/h in Colaba. There were bodies floating in floodwaters, and the cyclone cost the city 25 lakh rupees.

1950s

1950s

April 8–13, 1950 – A deep depression existed over the Bay of Bengal.
May 23–30, 1950 – A deep depression existed over the Bay of Bengal.
June 8–12, 1950 – A cyclonic storm existed over the Bay of Bengal.
June 23–28, 1950 – A depression existed over the Bay of Bengal.
July 10–12, 1950 – A depression existed over the Bay of Bengal.
July 11–15, 1950 – A depression existed over land.
July 25–30, 1950 – A depression existed over the Bay of Bengal.
August 3–7, 1950 – A depression existed over land.
August 9–15, 1950 – A depression existed over the Bay of Bengal.
September 1–5, 1950 – A depression existed over land.
September 9–11, 1950 – A depression existed over the Bay of Bengal.
September 12–19, 1950 – A cyclonic storm existed over the Bay of Bengal.
September 22–24, 1950 – A depression existed over the Bay of Bengal.
October 17–22, 1950 – A depression existed over the Bay of Bengal.
November 16–20, 1950 – A cyclonic storm existed over the Bay of Bengal.
December 2–6, 1950 – A cyclonic storm existed over the Bay of Bengal.

1956
In June, a cyclone struck Midnapore and killed 480 people.

1960s

1960

 The season was above average with five cyclones forming and one making landfall over India.

1961

The season was above average with five cyclones forming and three making landfall over India.

Severe Cyclonic Storm Four struck Southwestern India in May and did a considerable amount of damage.

1962

The season includes four cyclones with one cyclone entering from the West Pacific Ocean making a total five cyclones.

1963

The season was above average with seventeen depressions forming. Out of them, six cyclones formed with four making landfall in India. The season includes the first Super Cyclonic Storm to be recorded in the satellite era. 
Extremely Severe Cyclonic Storm Two caused heavy rainfall in Laccadive Islands. It was considered as one of the strongest Arabian Sea cyclone until 2001 India Cyclone based on the pressure. 
Deep Depression Four produced torrential rains in parts of Eastern India.
Deep Depression Nine caused 15 deaths form flooding in Orissa.
Very Severe Cyclonic Storm Twelve caused some damage and flooding in India, with loss of life also being reported.

1964

The season was above average with seven cyclones forming with three making landfall over India and one threatened the coast.

Super Cyclonic Storm Sixteen was the most powerful cyclone to strike Tamil Nadu and Ceylon. It also overturned a passenger train which killed 200 people on board. It destroyed the town of Dhanushkodi because of a  storm surge and after that, the Government of Madras said that it was 'unfit for human civilization' and declared as a ghost town.

1965

This season includes three deadly back-to-back cyclones affected West Bengal and Bangladesh collectively in the months of May, June and November killing up to 50,000 people.

1966

The season was above average with eight cyclones forming and six Intensifying further into severe cyclonic storms.
A cyclone struck Madras (now Chennai), India on November 3, killing over 50 people and leaving 800,000 people homeless.

1967

1968

1969

 
This season includes two back-to-back cyclones affecting Andhra Pradesh in the months of May and November killing 900 people collectively.

1970s

1970 

The season was above average with seven cyclones forming with two making landfall over India.

 Cyclonic Storm Four made landfall over Odisha in the month of June and brought widespread rainfall over East and Central India. Many places received more than 10 cm of rainfall at a single day. 
 Cyclonic Storm Eight formed as a land depression in the month of September and skirted the whole nation before entering into the Arabian Sea and intensifying up to the stage of cyclonic storm. Many states which were located in the track received heavy rainfall up to 40 cm. 
 Very Severe Cyclonic Storm Twelve on its initial stages brought heavy rainfall over Tamilnadu and made landfall at West Bengal in the month of November. Kolkata received gust winds as high as 120 kmph and Shillong received heavy rainfall up to 22 cm. Bangladesh suffered worst damage by the storm killing 290 people. Damages in India were unknown. 
Extremely Severe Cyclonic Storm Thirteen was the deadliest tropical cyclone in tropical cyclone history. It made landfall in East Pakistan (now called Bangladesh) but also caused significant effect in West Bengal and heavy rainfall in Andaman and Nicobar Islands. This cyclone made landfall within few days after Cyclone Twelve attacked the same area and brought additional damages there.

1971 

This season was above average with seven cyclones forming and four making landfall over India.
 Three cyclones hit back-to-back over the states of Odisha and West Bengal which brought considerable damages to livelihood and agricultural crops. 160 people were reported to be killed by the three storms.
 1971 Odisha cyclone hit the city of Paradip in the month of October and became deadly storm by killing 11,000 people. Whole state of Odisha has suffered damages due to gust winds up to 185 kmph.

1972

1973

1974

1975

1976

1977 

The season was above average with six cyclones forming with three making landfall over India. The season includes a Super Cyclonic Storm which later became the most intense to make landfall at Andhra Pradesh. The season includes two simultaneous cyclones on either side of the North Indian Ocean basin (Bay of Bengal and Arabian Sea) at a same time which became the first instance of such incident. The next time this would happen would be in 2018.
 Cyclonic Storm 04B formed in the month of October and hit Kavali in Andhra Pradesh and brought considerable damages to the telegram services, agricultural crops and property. No deaths were reported there.
 Very Severe Cyclonic Storm 05B hit Nagapattinam in Tamilnadu in the month of November and brought catastrophic damages to the agricultural crops. Nearly 560 people and 23,000 cattle were reported to be died and 10,00,000 people were affected. It made another landfall over Karnataka which became the first and only recorded cyclone to make landfall at that state.
 Super Cyclonic Storm 06B became one of the strongest cyclone to hit Andhra Pradesh since reliable records began in 1891. It hit Chirala on 22 November and became the deadliest cyclone worldwide for this year by killing 10,000 people and 5,00,000 cattle. Storm surge as high as 20 ft. hit the Diviseema Island at the time of landfall. It existed simultaneously with Very Severe Cyclonic Storm 04B at Arabian Sea which became the first simultaneous cyclones recorded in either side of Indian Ocean since records began and the next time to happen like this was on 2018.

1978 

The season was near normal with four cyclones forming and two making landfall over India. The season includes the powerful cyclone to hit Sri Lanka in the month of November and second year in a row to have a Super Cyclonic Storm.

 Super Cyclonic Storm 04B, after making landfall over Sri Lanka, made another landfall near Rameswaram in Tamil Nadu and brought damage to the houses and fishing boats. Overall damages were little in India. Its remnants were tracked into the Arabian Sea where it further travelled up to the coast of Kutch region of Gujarat.

1979 

The season was above average with six cyclones forming with two making landfall over India and one threatened the coast.

 Extremely Severe Cyclonic Storm 01B made landfall near Ongole in Andhra Pradesh in the month of May with windspeed of 175 kmph and brought some damage to the state. Nearly 700 people and 300,000 cattle were reported dead. It was the worst storm to hit the state since Super Cyclonic Storm Six (06B) which struck two years prior.

1980s

1980

The season was near normal with four cyclones forming and one making landfall over India. All the cyclones remained weak in the season as no cyclones intensified further than Cyclonic Storm.

 Cyclonic Storm 01B skirted Cape Comorin after making landfall over Sri Lanka. No damages and deaths were reported in India.
 Cyclonic Storm 02B made landfall over Andhra Pradesh in the month of October. Damages were unknown.
 Cyclonic Storm 04B threatened the coast of Tamilnadu but well remained offshore. It produced heavy rainfall over there.

1981

 The season was above average with five cyclones forming and four making landfall over India.
 Two depressions hit the states of Odisha and West Bengal in the months of August and September and brought considerable damages to those states.
 Very Severe Cyclonic Storm 01B made two landfalls over Tamilnadu and Gujarat in the month of November and brought considerable damages there.
 Very Severe Cyclonic Storm 03B skirted the coasts of Odisha and West Bengal in the month of December before making landfall over Bangladesh. It was the latest storm to hit Bangladesh since reliable records began. 200 people were reported to be died in both the nations.

1982

The season was above average with five cyclones forming with all of them making landfall over India.

Extremely Severe Cyclonic Storm BOB 02 made landfall near Paradip in Odisha in the month of May and killed 150 people. It was the most powerful cyclone to hit the state during the pre-monsoon season until Cyclone Fani in 2019 according to the Indian Meteorological Department .
Severe Cyclonic Storm BOB 03 and Severe Cyclonic Storm BOB 04 made back-to-back landfall over Andhra Pradesh within a span of a week in the month of October. But damages and deaths attributed by the storms were less. 
Extremely Severe Cyclonic Storm ARB 01 made landfall at Porbandar in Gujarat and brought highest rainfall for the city on record of 120 cm in the month of November. Nearly 340 people were reported to be died due to the storm. It was the latest date for a cyclone in the North Indian Ocean basin to make landfall at the West Coast of India.

1983

The season was below average with two cyclones forming and one making landfall over India. The season includes one basin crossover from the West Pacific Ocean named as Tropical Storm Kim as a Deep Depression but haven't intensified further in the basin.

Cyclonic Storm 02B formed on 1 October and hit Andhra Pradesh coast three days later. Damages and deaths were unknown.

1984

The season was near normal with four cyclones forming and three making landfall over India. The season includes the first recorded cyclone to make landfall at Somalia and became the westernmost landfall of an North Indian Ocean cyclone until 2018 Cyclone Sagar.

Very Severe Cyclonic Storm 02B hit Odisha in the month of September but less damages take place with no deaths reported.
Extremely Severe Cyclonic Storm 03B made landfall at Sriharikota in Andhra Pradesh in the month of November and brought worst damage to the state and nearby Tamil Nadu. Nearly 430 people were reported to be died due to the storm.
Extremely Severe Cyclonic Storm 04B made landfall at Cuddalore in Tamil Nadu in the month of December and brought considerable damage to the agricultural crops.

1985

This season was an above average season with six cyclones forming and five of them making landfall in India.

 Cyclonic Storm ARB 02 made landfall near Dwarka in  Gujarat in the month of June with less damage and no deaths reported.
 Cyclonic Storms BOB 03,05,06 made back-to-back landfall over Andhra Pradesh in the months of October,November and December. Damages and deaths were unknown. 
 Cyclonic Storm BOB 04 made landfall at Odisha in the month of October killing 38 people there. Storm surge as high as 2 metres hit the coast at the time of landfall which resulted the coastal villages to submerge in sea water for two days.

1986

 
The season was least active as only one cyclone forming from three systems. The one cyclone itself made landfall over India. It was the second least active in the North Indian Ocean basin next to 1993.

Cyclonic Storm 02B skirted the coasts of Andhra Pradesh and Odisha before making landfall near the border of India and Bangladesh in the month of November. Damages and deaths were not reported in the nation.

1987

 
The season was above average with five cyclones forming and includes two unofficial storm monitored by the JTWC making a total seven cyclones. Four of them made landfall over India.

 Cyclonic Storm 04B and Severe Cyclonic Storm 06B made back-to-back landfall over the state of Andhra Pradesh in the months of October and November bringing moderate damages over there.
 Severe Cyclonic Storm 05B brought worst damage to the state of Andhra Pradesh which was already affected by the Cyclonic Storm 04B a fortnight ago, killing 50 people and 26,000 cattle.
 Cyclonic Storm 07A made landfall twice over the nation. Once near Tondi as a weak depression and next near Murud-Janjira as a tropical storm. Damages were reported to be minimal.

1988

The season was below average with three cyclones forming with one making landfall over India.
 Extremely Severe Cyclonic Storm Four made landfall over the Sunderbans in the border of India and Bangladesh and brought worst damages to there. West Bengal reported 220-500 deaths associated with the storm and brought heavy rainfall over Northeast India. But most of the damages were in Bangladesh.

1989

The season was below average with two cyclones forming and includes one cyclone entering the basin from the West Pacific Ocean making a total three cyclones. Out of them, all made landfall over India. It was the first time to have a Super Cyclonic Storm since 1977 and it was first in a row to have a Super Cyclonic Storm.

 Severe Cyclonic Storm BOB 01 made landfall over Odisha in the month of May and brought heavy rainfall over there killing 70 people. Its effects were felt as far as Nepal.
 Cyclonic Storm BOB 05 made landfall over Visakhapatnam in the month of October which became the deadly storm killing near 600 people in flooding over various areas of Andhra Pradesh , Telangana , Maharashtra and Karnataka. Its remnants tracked until the Arabian Sea and maintained its circulation without any regeneration there.
 Super Cyclonic Storm Gay entered the basin from the West Pacific Ocean which became the strongest Indo-Pacific basin crossover since reliable records began in 1891 as a Category 2 equivalent cyclone. Already brought deadly and catastrophic damages to Thailand as a Category 3 Typhoon. It brought hurricane-force winds over Andaman and Nicobar islands for the first time. The next time to have hurricane-force winds over the islands were in 2013 by Cyclone Lehar. In its existence over Bay of Bengal, it intensified further to a Super Cyclonic Storm and Category 5 equivalent cyclone. Soon it made landfall over Kavali in Andhra Pradesh in its immense strength and its remnants tracked till the coast of Gujarat. But land interaction made the storm to get dissipated by that time. 65 people were killed in India associated with the storm.

1990s

1990

The season was below average with two cyclones forming and one making landfall over India. The season includes one Super Cyclonic Storm which was the second consecutive season with this type of storm. 
Super Cyclonic Storm BOB 01 formed on 4 May 1990. It made landfall at the equivalent to a Category 3 tropical cyclone on Andhra Pradesh on May 9. As it moved inland it weakened and dissipated on May 10. The cyclone killed 967 people and caused $600 million (1990 USD) in damages. It was the worst storm to hit South India in pre-monsoon season until Cyclone Laila in 2010.  
Deep Depression BOB 07 formed over  southern Bay of Bengal, moved northwestward and made landfall on southern Odisha on November 3. The system caused $110 million in damage and 250 deaths.

1991

The season was below average with three cyclones forming with one unofficial storm monitored by the JTWC making a total four cyclones but only one makes landfall over India. It was the third and final consecutive season to have a Super Cyclonic Storm. 
Depression BOB 04 formed on August 21. It made landfall on the same day on the state of Odisha and managed to keep its intensity until dissipating on August 26.
Depression BOB 05 formed in the Bay of Bengal on September 21. It struck Andhra Pradesh and dissipated the next day.
Depression BOB 07 formed in the Bay of Bengal on October 28. It made landfall on Tamil Nadu and dissipated on October 30.
Cyclonic Storm BOB 08 formed on November 9. It hit the state of Tamil Nadu on November 15, and dissipated the next day. The cyclone killed 40 people from flooding. 48 cm of rain fell in Karaikal.

1992

The season was above average with seven cyclones forming and only one making landfall over India. It was earlier one of the most active North Indian Ocean cyclone season on record but at present tied with 2018 and 2019 seasons as most active ever. 
Deep Depression BOB 02 formed on June 17 and made landfall on Odisha later that day. The storm killed 41 people.
Deep Depression BOB 03 formed on July 24, a rare date for a cyclone to form. It made landfall on July 26. It later dissipated inland.
Deep Depression BOB 04 formed on October 6. It moved westward and hit India at that intensity and dissipated on the 9th. Overall, it killed 98 people. 
Severe Cyclonic Storm BOB 07 entered the basin on November 8. After landfall on Sri Lanka, it intensified into a severe cyclonic storm. It finally made landfall as a tropical storm on India on the 17th. The cyclone killed at least 263 people and caused $69 million (1992 USD) in damages.

1993

The season was below average with only two cyclones forming with both of them making landfall over India. The season was least active in the whole North Indian Ocean basin because in overall only four systems formed. 
Very Severe Cyclonic Storm ARB 01/02 formed as a depression southwest of India on November 8. As a depression, it made landfall on southwestern India and moved northwestward, intensifying into a Very Severe Cyclonic Storm. It dissipated near northwest India. Its landfall as a depression caused 35 deaths.
Extremely Severe Cyclonic Storm BOB 02 formed on the Bay of Bengal on December 1. The system gradually moved towards southeast India, making landfall as a Extremely Severe Cyclonic Storm (Category 1 Cyclone) on December 4. It dissipated on the same day. The system caused $216 million (1993 USD) in damages and killed 70 people.

1994

The season was near normal with four cyclones forming and one making landfall over India. 
Severe Cyclonic Storm BOB 03 formed on October 29. The next day, the IMD upgraded the storm to a severe cyclonic storm. Early on October 31, the system made landfall near Chennai in southwestern India. It dissipated the same day. The storm killed 304 people and caused $115 million (1994 USD) in damage.

1995

The season was near normal with four cyclones forming and two making landfall over India.
 Cyclonic Storm BOB 05 made landfall in West Bengal in the month of October and brought heavy rainfall over there. 50 cm of rainfall fell in Malda associated with the storm.
 Very Severe Cyclonic Storm BOB 06 made landfall close to the border of Andhra Pradesh and Odisha and brought widespread rainfall there. 73 people were reported to be killed by the storm and its remnants led to the deadly snow storm and avalanche in Nepal killing 200 people making a total 290 deaths. The damages from the storm were $40 million.

1996

 The season was above average with five cyclones forming along with one cyclone monitored by the JTWC making a total six cyclones with five of them making landfall over India.
 Cyclonic Storm BOB 02 formed at a very rare location for the month of June at Southeast Bay of Bengal. It skirted the coasts of Tamilnadu and Andhra Pradesh up to 45 km from Nellore and made landfall at Visakhapatnam. Chennai recorded its highest June rainfall of 35 cms. in a single day. Total 120 deaths were reported in India due to the storm. 
 Severe Cyclonic Storm ARB 01 made landfall at Gujarat in the month of June and brought considerable damages over there. 48 people were reported to be died due to the storm. 
 Severe Cyclonic Storm ARB 02 tracked a rarest path in the North Indian Ocean on record. Making its first landfall near Sriharikota as a well-marked low pressure area and then intensifying further on reaching the Arabian Sea to become a Severe Cyclonic Storm making a loop off the coast of Gujarat and then moving towards Somalia in southwest direction. It caused worst damages to Rayalaseema region of Andhra Pradesh as a low killing 388 people. 
 Very Severe Cyclonic Storm BOB 05 made landfall at Kakinada in the month of November as a Category 4 equivalent tropical cyclone with windspeed of 215 kmph. It brought catastrophic damages to the state killing 1077 people which became deadliest cyclone for the year worldwide. It was the worst storm for the state since 1990 Andhra Pradesh cyclone. 
 Very Severe Cyclonic Storm BOB 06 made a rare and long four-day loop in the ocean before making landfall over Tamil Nadu in the month of December. 7 people were killed due to the storm and damage was less than expected.

1997

The season was below average with two cyclones forming and includes Tropical Storm Linda which entered the basin from the West Pacific Ocean and an unofficial storm monitored by the JTWC making a total four cyclones. But not even a single cyclone made landfall over India despite the season is in El Nino . But  one threatened the coast.
 Severe Cyclonic Storm BOB 07 skirted the coasts of Odisha and West Bengal before making landfall over Bangladesh. Its outer bands brought rainfall in India. Damages to India was relatively less.

1998

The season was above average with six cyclones forming and three making landfall over India and one threatened the coast. 
Severe Cyclonic Storm BOB 01 strengthened into a Tropical Cyclone in May 18. The storm made landfall as a 80 mph Severe Cyclonic Storm. The storm killed 35 people and 504 people were missing in the nation of Bangladesh. It brought heavy rainfall over Northeast India.
Extremely Severe Cyclonic Storm ARB 02 strengthened into the equivalent of a major hurricane with winds reaching 195 km/h (115 mph) on 9 June before making landfall near Porbandar in the Indian state of Gujarat between 01:00 and 02:00 UTC. 1173 died from the storm and 1774 were reported missing. It was the worst storm to hit Gujarat since 1982.
 Cyclonic Storm ARB 05 brought considerable rainfall over Gujarat. Damage was less expected as it was already affected by Extremely Severe Cyclonic Storm ARB 02. But 250 fishermen were reported to be missing by the storm.
 Very Severe Cyclonic Storm BOB 05 made landfall between Kakinada and Visakhapatnam in the month of November and brought damages to agricultural crops. 6 people were killed in Andhra Pradesh.
 Very Severe Cyclonic Storm BOB 06 skirted the coasts of Odisha and West Bengal before making landfall over Bangladesh. But most of the damages were in Bangladesh and only brought little rainfall to India.

1999

The season was near normal with four cyclones forming and two making landfall over India. The season includes the most intense cyclone ever recorded in North Indian Ocean basin on record. 
Extremely Severe Cyclonic Storm ARB 01 affected India along with Pakistan.
Tropical Storm 03B had affected eastern India and its damage and death report is unknown. It was unofficially monitored by JTWC.
Deep Depression BOB 02 was formed on June 17 and made landfall in Berhampur, however it was considered as a monsoonal depression by IMD.
Deep Depression BOB 03 was formed on July 27 which was weak depression with minimal damage.
Depression BOB 04 was formed on August 6 which made landfall in the state of Odisha.
Extremely Severe Cyclonic Storm BOB 05 and the Super Cyclonic Storm BOB 06 made back-to-back over Odisha in the month of October killing more than 15,000 people.

2000s

2000 

The season was above average with five cyclones forming with two Indian landfall and one threatening the coast of India. 
Depression BOB 02 impacted Andhra Pradesh and caused massive and widespread flooding and destruction of crops.
Cyclonic Storm BOB 03 formed on October 15 and dissipated before landfall. The remnants brought heavy rainfall in Andhra Pradesh and resulted in death of 100 pelican chicks.
Cyclonic Storm BOB 04 made landfall in Bangladesh and brought heavy rainfall to North East India
Extremely Severe Cyclonic Storm BOB 05 impacted Tamil Nadu on November 29, resulting in 12 deaths and brought widespread rainfall. 
Extremely Severe Cyclonic Storm BOB 06 brought heavy rainfall to Southern India and the damage was minimal.

2001 

The season was above average with four cyclones forming with one Tropical Storm Vamei entering from the West Pacific Ocean making a total of five cyclones. But only one makes landfall over India and another threatening the coast. 
Extremely Severe Cyclonic Storm ARB 01 formed in Arabian Sea on May 21 and impacted the Indian state of Gujarat as a weakening storm. Damage was minimal but nearly 1000 fishermens were feared to be lost in the storm.
Cyclonic Storms ARB 02 and 03 brought considerable rainfall over Gujarat but damages were minimal. 
Depression BOB 01 made landfall near Paradip on June 12. It dropped heavy rainfall on its path
Cyclonic Storm BOB 02 formed on October 14 in Bay of Bengal and made landfall near Nellore. While moving ashore, the storm dropped heavy rainfall in Andhra Pradesh and extending into Tamil Nadu, causing floods in some areas for the first time in 40 years. It also caused worst flooding over Kadapa by killing more than 100 people. 
Depression BOB 03 also impacted East India. 150mm of rainfall was recorded in Paradip.

2002 

The season was near normal with four cyclones forming and one making landfall over India. 
Depression BOB 02 formed on October 23 and remained quasi-stationary near Andhra Pradesh coast. It caused rainfall in Eastern India and no damage was reported.
Severe Cyclonic Storm BOB 03 impacted West Bengal on November 12 resulting in 173 deaths. It caused damages to Bangladesh and India.

2003 

The season was below normal with three cyclones forming with one making landfall over India. Another storm threatened the coast of India. It was the last season to have unnamed cyclones in the North Indian Ocean basin.
Very Severe Cyclonic Storm BOB 01 brought little rainfall to the Andaman and Nicobar islands but worsened the condition of heatwave over South India. It resulted in a deadly heatwave outbreak killing 1500 people as it moved away from the Indian coast and hit Myanmar. Due to the heatwave, Chennai recorded its highest maximum temperature in record of 45 °C.
Severe Cyclonic Storm BOB 07 attacked Diviseema in Andhra Pradesh in the month of December which brought widespread rainfall and agricultural crop damage. 85 people were killed due to the floods associated with the storm.

2004 

The season was near normal with four cyclones forming and not even a single cyclone making landfall over India. But two cyclones threatened the coast of India. The season was the first instance when naming of storms over North Indian Ocean basin has begun with Cyclone Onil formed in the month of September.
Severe Cyclonic Storm ARB 01 brought heavy rainfall over Kerala, Karnataka and Goa which later became the first cyclone to directly threaten Kerala since records began in 1891. It also brought torrential rainfall over Lakshadweep Islands and killed 9 people. 230 cm of rainfall fell over the island of Amindivi which became second wettest storm in North Indian Ocean basin and 15th wettest storm worldwide on record.
Severe Cyclonic Storm Onil became the first named storm in the North Indian Ocean basin on record which formed in the month of September. It skirted the coast of Gujarat and brought considerable rainfall there. Nearly 900 fishermens were feared to have lost in the storm. It brought little damage to nearby Pakistan.

2005 

The season was near normal with four cyclones forming and three making landfall over India. This season was the first instance when there were no cyclones intensified further than Cyclonic Storm. The other season to do so was 2012.
 Cyclonic Storm Pyarr tracked a rare path from northeast to southwest in the month of September in the Bay of Bengal and made landfall over Kalingapatnam in Andhra Pradesh. It killed 65 people in Andhra and adjoining Odisha.
 Cyclonic Storm Baaz and Cyclonic Storm Fanoos made back-to-back landfall over Tamil Nadu and adjoining Puducherry which brought widespread rainfall over there. Cyclone Baaz killed 11 people but damages from Cyclone Fanoos and Baaz were minimal. There were agricultural crop damages too.

2006 
 
The season was below average with three cyclones forming but only one making landfall over India.

Deep depression BOB 02 affected eastern India and damage was unknown.
Severe Cyclonic Storm Mukda looped off the coast of Gujarat in the month of September and brought considerable and beneficial rains. 
Cyclonic Storm Ogni made a record in North Indian Ocean basin as smallest cyclone to ever record with 85 km in diameter. It hit Ongole in Andhra Pradesh on 29 October and made damage to the agricultural crops.

2007

The season was near normal with four cyclones forming but the season has no Indian landfall. But depressions formed in this season were the deadliest. It saw the first Super Cyclonic Storm in the basin since 1999 and the first to ever record in the Arabian Sea. It was also the first time to have two category 5 equivalent cyclone in one minute mean in a single season. 
Cyclonic Storm Yemyin formed over Bay of Bengal and made landfall over Machilipatnam in the month of June as a Deep Depression and brought widespread floods over Andhra Pradesh, Telangana, Karnataka, Maharashtra and Gujarat killing 150 people. This was because the storm maintained its intensity and crossed into the Arabian Sea where it intensified further into a Cyclonic Storm and brought catastrophic damages over Pakistan which was the first cyclone to hit the nation since 1999.
Depressions and Deep Depressions BOB 04, 05, 06, 07, 08 which formed in the months from July to November brought damages over India killing many people.
Extremely Severe Cyclonic Storm Sidr resulted in a northeast monsoon failure over Chennai and adjoining areas of South Karnataka, Rayalaseema and Coastal Andhra regions as it moved away from India and hit Bangladesh in the month of November killing 15000 people which became the deadliest cyclone worldwide for the year 2007.

2008

The season was near normal with four cyclones forming and two making landfall over India.
Cyclonic Storm Rashmi after making landfall over Bangladesh entered into India and brought heavy rainfall and deadly landslides over Northeast India killing 20 people in those places.
Cyclonic Storm Khai-Muk made landfall over Kavali in Andhra Pradesh bringing heavy rainfall and severe agricultural crop damages in Coastal Andhra districts.
Cyclonic Storm Nisha made landfall over Cuddalore in the month of December and brought catastrophic damages over Tamil Nadu and Sri Lanka. Nearly 200 people were killed by this storm and remains the 10th wettest storm in the Indian Ocean basin on record. 69 cm of rainfall fell over the town of Orathanadu in Thanjavur District which was highest single day rainfall from a cyclone in South India at that time later surpassed by Cyclone Phyan which formed in next year.

2009

The season was near normal with four cyclones forming with two making landfall over India. 
Cyclonic Storm Bijli skirted the coast of Odisha and West Bengal in the month of April which later became the ninth wettest tropical cyclone in India.
Severe Cyclonic Storm Aila formed on May 23 and made landfall in the state of West Bengal on May 25. It caused 149 fatalities and more than 100,000 people left homeless and the damage cost was US$1 billion. It was the worst cyclone after Cyclone Sidr.
Depression ARB 01 formed on June 23 and made landfall in the state of Gujarat. It killed nine people due to lightning.
Depression ARB 02 formed on June 25 and made landfall in the state of Gujarat. It caused heavy rainfall.
Deep Depression BOB 03 formed on July 20 and made landfall in Digha, West Bengal. It caused 43 fatalities in Odisha.
Deep Depression BOB 04 formed on September 4 and made landfall in Digha. One person was reportedly drowned due to high sea current.
Cyclonic Storm Phyan formed on November 4 and made landfall in Pune in Maharashtra. It became the fifth wettest tropical cyclone in India.

2010s

2010

The season was above average with five cyclones forming with two Indian landfall. The above average activity was influenced by the La Nina.

Severe Cyclonic Storm Laila caused $117 million in damage and 65 people were Killed. It was the first cyclone to hit South India during pre-monsoon season in 20 years.
Severe Cyclonic Storm Jal hit Tamil Nadu and made a direct hit over Chennai and brought considerable damage in the month of November.

2011

This season was below average with two cyclones forming with one making landfall over India. 
Depression ARB 01 affected Gujarat and Maharashtra but no deaths and Damage were reported.
Very Severe Cyclonic Storm Thane made landfall over Cuddalore in Tamilnadu on 30 December which marks the latest date for a cyclone to make landfall anywhere in the Indian Ocean basin. It made catastrophic damage over, Puducherry and Tamilnadu.

2012

This season had the latest start in the North Indian Ocean basin on record by first system forming on 12 October. It was the least active season since 1993 as only five systems formed and two cyclones forming. One made landfall in India out of two cyclones. 
Cyclonic Storm Nilam was the deadly storm and the only cyclone to make landfall in India on that year, attacked Mamallapuram in Tamilnadu on October and brought worse damage to that state and Rayalaseema region of Andhra Pradesh. It killed 75 people in those places.

2013

The season was above average with five cyclones forming and four making landfall over India. 
Cyclonic Storm Viyaru worsened the heatwave conditions over South India as it moved away from India and hit Bangladesh.
Extremely Severe Cyclonic Storm Phailin was a category 5 hurricane and made landfall over Gopalpur in Odisha which makes the most intense storm to make landfall at Odisha since 1999 Odisha Cyclone. More than a million people have been evacuated in preparedness for this cyclone.
Severe Cyclonic Storm Helen and Very Severe Cyclonic Storm Lehar made back-to-back landfall over Machilipatnam in Andhra Pradesh in the month of November. But damage was minimal as both the cyclones weakened when it makes landfall. But Cyclone Helen killed 12 people in Andhra Pradesh.
Very Severe Cyclonic Storm Madi tracked a rare path in the Bay of Bengal by moving northeast initially and making sharp turn towards southwest in the month of December. It brought beneficial rains to Tamilnadu and damage was minimal.

2014

The season was below average with only three cyclones forming with only one making landfall over India. 
Cyclonic Storm Nanauk formed over the Arabian Sea but delayed the onset of the Southwest Monsoon over Kerala.
Extremely Severe Cyclonic Storm Hudhud made a catastrophic landfall in its peak intensity of category 4 hurricane over Visakhapatnam on 14 October and made worse damage to that place. Its remnants were traced back till the Western Himalayas which is very rare.

2015

The season despite being under powerful El Nino which was near normal with four cyclones forming, but the season haven't feature even a single Indian landfall. But depressions formed during monsoons were the deadliest.

Deep Depression ARB 02 affected Gujarat, causing $260 million in damage and 81 deaths.
Cyclonic Storm Komen after attacking Bangladesh entered into India and brought worst flooding over East India killing 285 people which makes it the deadliest cyclone worldwide in the year 2015.
Deep Depression BOB 03 along with northeast monsoon seasonal low pressures in the months of November and December brought worst flooding over Tamilnadu and Chennai in 100 years. It killed nearly 500 people and unofficially makes one of the costliest disasters in India on record by damages exceeding up to $15 billion.

2016

The season was near normal with four cyclones forming with three affecting India and one threatened the coast. 
Cyclonic Storm Roanu tracked a rare path in the month of May by skirting the whole East Coast of India and brought beneficial rains for Tamil Nadu, Andhra Pradesh and Odisha, which were suffering from the deadly heatwave associated with the El Nino . 
Very Severe Cyclonic Storm Vardah attacked Tamilnadu and making a direct hit over Chennai killing 12 people and damages of $4.3 billion.

2017

The season was below average with three cyclones forming with one affecting India. 
Cyclonic Storm Maarutha worsened the conditions of the heatwave over South India as it moved away from the Indian landmass and attacked Myanmar. It was one of the only three cyclones to form in the first fifteen days in the month of April in the satellite era as formation of cyclones are very rare during that time. 
Severe Cyclonic Storm Mora after attacking Bangladesh in the month of May brought deadly landslides over Northeast India which killed 20 people. 
Depression BOB 04 affected Odisha and caused 7 deaths and $34 million in damage.
Land Depression 01 caused dangerous floods in West Bengal. At least 152 people died, while nearly 2 million people were affected in over 160 villages, which were inundated due to heavy rains.
Land Depression 02 produced heavy rainfall in East India, and also caused 3 deaths in Odisha by lightning and heavy rainfall. The system caused 200 mm of rainfall in Durgapur. Halisahar recorded 105 mm with strong gusty wind of 65 km/h.
Depression BOB 05 caused the Odisha state government on October 20 to declare the heavy rains caused by the storm as a "State-Specific Disaster". Heavy damage to homes were reported in Balasore and Bhadrak districts, with an infant reported to have died in the former district following the collapse of a wall.
Very Severe Cyclonic Storm Ockhi lashed heavy rainfall across Southern tip of India as it neared up to 30 km from the coast, killing 318 and displaced many people. It followed a rare path from Bay of Bengal to the Arabian Sea and only one of the five cyclones to do so by attacking the Southern tip of India since reliable records began in 1851. Many fishermens were feared to get lost by this storm as they don't know properly about the cyclone's rare trajectory. It brought rare December rainfall over Maharashtra and Gujarat as a weakening low pressure area combined with a western disturbance.

2018

The season was first in the series of three consecutive years of above average activity. Total seven cyclones formed with four attacking India which is the highest amount since 1992. The season was first time since 1977 to have simultaneous cyclones in either sides of the North Indian Ocean (Bay of Bengal and Arabian Sea) at a same time. 
Deep Depression BOB 03 caused heavy rainfall in western Uttar Pradesh and the Indian capital of New Delhi. Rainfall peaked at Meerut in Uttar Pradesh which received 226 mm of rain in 24 hours. The river Yamuna crossed the danger level and reached to 205.5 meters by July 29, prompting the evacuation of more than 1,500 people in Delhi.
Depression BOB 04, Depression BOB 05 and Deep Depression BOB 06 were short lived storms which affected eastern India during the months of August and September.
Cyclonic Storm Daye impacted south Odisha early on September 21, near Gopalpur. Daye continued moving westward, while dropping heavy amounts of rain across India. It was the first September cyclone in the Bay of Bengal since Cyclone Pyarr in the year 2005. Minimal damage was reported.
Very Severe Cyclonic Storm Titli made landfall near Palasa, Andhra Pradesh, at peak intensity of 150 km/h. Titli killed at least 77 people in Odisha and left a couple of others missing, due to heavy flooding and landslides. It caused major destruction to East Coast railway.
Very Severe Cyclonic Storm Gaja made landfall in southern India, on November 16. The storm survived crossing over into the Arabian Sea later that day; however, it degenerated into a remnant low in hostile conditions only several days later, on November 20. 52 people were killed.
Severe Cyclonic Storm Phethai developed in the southern Bay of Bengal on December 13. It steadily strengthened and on December 16, and made landfall at Katrenikona on December 17, with 3-minute sustained winds of 50 mph. 8 people were reported dead.

2019

It also became the strongest tropical cyclone to make landfall in the state of Odisha after 1999 Odisha Cyclone and Phailin. Damages cost was US$8.1 billion.
The remnants of Very Severe Cyclonic Storm Vayu impacted Gujarat causing some damage. 8 deaths were reported. Initially the storm skirted the Saurashtra coast of Gujarat as a minimal category 3 major tropical cyclone.
Deep Depression BOB 03, around 08:00–09:00 UTC, made landfall along the north Odisha-West Bengal coastline on August 7. Heavy rainfall was recorded in many parts of Odisha, peaking at 382.6 mm (15.06 in) in Lanjigarh. 3 deaths were reported
Very Severe Cyclonic Storm Hikaa sunk a boat which carried 11 Indian fishermen. As of October 17, six of them were confirmed dead, and the other five remained missing.
Land Depression 01 formed on September 30 and caused minimal damage.
The outer bands of Super Cyclonic Storm Kyarr on skirting Maharashtra coast caused heavy rainfall in some portions of Western India. It also caused an increase in vector borne diseases in some areas.
Extremely Severe Cyclonic Storm Maha caused minor damage in western and southern India. It then made landfall near Gujarat as a depression and quickly weakened afterwards.
Very Severe Cyclonic Storm Bulbul formed on November 6 from the remnants of Severe Tropical Storm Matmo which traversed into the Bay of Bengal. Bulbul then underwent a rapid intensification, becoming a very severe cyclonic storm on November 8 and made landfall at West Bengal. It produced heavy rain over many parts of West Bengal
Deep Depression ARB 06 on its initial stages brought heavy rainfall over South India and killed 25 people.

2020s

2020

The season was third consecutive year of above average activity as five cyclones formed this year with three making landfall over India. The season was the second in a row to have a Super Cyclonic Storm and the first to record in Bay of Bengal since 1999.
Super Cyclonic Storm Amphan  explosively intensified from a Category 1-equivalent cyclone to a Category 4-equivalent cyclone in just 6 hours and further into category 5-equivalent cyclone and Super Cyclonic Storm. It made landfall on May 20 near Bakkhali, West Bengal after weakening subsequently. It left behind a trail of catastrophic damage, and was later confirmed to be the costliest storm ever recorded in the basin. 128 deaths were recorded.
Severe Cyclonic Storm Nisarga made landfall near the coastal town of Alibag in Maharashtra at 12:30 IST on June 3. About 400mm of rain was recorded at Kavaratti. It was the first cyclone to make landfall at Maharashtra since Cyclone Phyan in the year 2009.
Deep Depression BOB 02 developed over the west-central Bay of Bengal, though the system was originally observed near the Spratly Islands over the South China Sea on October 6 and made landfall in Andhra Pradesh near Kakinada in the early hours of October 13. The torrential rains caused flash flooding in Hyderabad killing at least 80 people.
Very Severe Cyclonic Storm Nivar made landfall between Karaikal and Mamallapuram around Puducherry on November 25. 14 deaths and $600 million damages were reported. It brought considerable damage to Andhra Pradesh too. 
Cyclonic Storm Burevi dropped heavy rainfall across south India. It brought heavy rainfall over Tamil Nadu and those places which were already affected by Cyclone Nivar. The storm killed 9 people.

2021

This season was fourth consecutive year of above average activity with five cyclones forming and three making landfall over India and one threatened the coast.
Depression BOB 01 caused light to moderate rainfall with minimal damage in the Andaman and Nicobar Islands as a rare early April system.
Extremely Severe Cyclonic Storm Tauktae caused heavy rainfall and high gust winds in South India, Gujarat, Goa and Maharashtra. It made landfall on the southern coast of Saurashtra peninusula in Gujarat and caused moderate to heavy damage in the southern peninsular coastal areas of Gujarat. It was the worst storm to hit Gujarat in 20 years since 1998 Gujarat cyclone.
Very Severe Cyclonic Storm Yaas made landfall over the state of Odisha becoming the second cyclone to hit the nation within a span of ten days. The most affected states are West Bengal and Odisha. At least 10 million people were affected and 300,000 houses were damaged. Most them were caused by storm surge, high astronomical tides and broken embankments. The cyclone also affected Nepal and Bangladesh.
Deep Depression BOB 03 affected Odisha, killing three. 2 people died after separate house collapses and another person reportedly drowned in a drain.
Cyclone Gulab hit Andhra Pradesh close to Kalingapatnam on September 26 becoming the first cyclone to form in Bay of Bengal for the month of September since Cyclone Daye of 2018. Twenty people were killed due to the storm in various places of Central India. Its remnants affected Maharashtra and Gujarat, later on becoming Cyclone Shaheen by reaching the Arabian Sea on September 30.
Depression BOB 05 and Depression BOB 06 made back-to-back landfall over the state of Tamilnadu gave extremely heavy rainfall over the state along with Puducherry and Andhra Pradesh while the latter one had caused historic flooding after 20 years over Rayalaseema and additional rainfall over there. Overall deaths from both the systems were estimated to be near hundred. 
 Cyclone Jawad skirted and threatened the coasts of Andhra Pradesh, Odisha and West Bengal before weakening into a low pressure area and making landfall over the Sunderbans. Two deaths were reported due to the cyclone.

2022

This season ended the streak of four consecutive years with above average cyclone activity by having only three cyclones forming this year and two making landfall over India. 
 Cyclone Asani becomes a rare cyclone after making landfall in the state of Andhra Pradesh. It was the first cyclone to do so in pre-monsoon since Cyclone Laila of 2010. Rainfall from the storm helped relieve people while a local heatwave was occurring. Three deaths were reported and overall damages were minimal.
Deep Depression BOB 06 makes landfall in the state of West Bengal in August as a monsoon depression. Large amounts of rainfall were reported in East and North India and the remnants later contributed to the 2022 Pakistan floods.
Cyclone Mandous made landfall close to Chennai in December causing moderate damages in South India. Four deaths were reported in the state of Tamilnadu. Its remnants later entered into the Arabian Sea and regenerated into Deep Depression ARB 03.

Climatology

Records  
The most intense tropical cyclone to make landfall was the 1999 Odisha Cyclone which hit the state of Odisha.
The costliest tropical cyclone was Cyclone Amphan of 2020 which hit the state of  Odisha and West Bengal. The damage cost was US$13 billion beating the record of Cyclone Nargis.
The deadliest is the 1839 India cyclone which hit the present day state of Andhra Pradesh. It caused over 300,000 fatalities and 20,000 ship destroyed.

See also 
North Indian Ocean cyclone season
Tropical cyclones in Bangladesh
Tropical cyclones in Myanmar
Tropical cyclones in Sri Lanka

References

External links
 Indian Meteorological Department
RSMC New Delhi

 
India